Clarke Garrison is a fictional character on the CBS soap opera The Bold and the Beautiful, portrayed from 1987 to 1992 and from 1996 to 2009 by actor Daniel McVicar.

Character's background
McVicar describes Clarke as "the classic heel with a heart, a cad with a conscience". He is a former fashion designer for the now-defunct Spectra Fashions.

Originally a student at Otis Parsons Institute the eternally ambitious character has always wrestled with the balance between ambition and questions of the heart.

Family
He has two sons, C.J. (most recently played by Mick Cain) from his marriage to Sally Spectra (played by Darlene Conley), and Mark (Michael Dietz) from his affair with Margo Lynley (Lauren Koslow). He was also once married to Kristen Forrester (then played by Teri Ann Linn). Their relationship began when Kristen's mother, Stephanie (Susan Flannery), hired Clarke to seduce Kristen, fearing that her daughter was frigid. Clarke began to have feelings for Kristen and they married, before splitting later.

Clarke left town in September 1992, returning four years later to see his son, C.J. (then played by Kyle Sabihy). C.J. wanted nothing to do with his father, angry at Clarke for walking out on him and Sally. This changed when Clarke rescued him from kidnappers.

Close relationships
Clarke and Sally remained close friends; she affectionately called him "Bucky". He also shared a bond with Sally's former receptionist, Darla (Schae Harrison), who Sally thought of as a daughter.

After a disastrous flirtation with Morgan DeWitt (Sarah Buxton), which almost ended with Clarke being killed by her pet python, "Patsy", Clarke began to woo a recently returned Kristen (now Tracy Melchior). His attempts at seducing his ex-wife were unsuccessful, as Kristen moved on with Tony Dominguez (Paulo Benedeti).

Alliance with Amber
Perhaps Clarke's most notable lapse in judgement was in early 2005, when he reluctantly helped a vengeful Amber Moore (Adrienne Frantz) trap Ridge Forrester (Ronn Moss) and his stepdaughter Bridget Forrester (Ashley Jones) down a mineshaft in the hope that they would give into their "feelings" for one another, destroying Ridge's marriage to Brooke Logan Forrester (Katherine Kelly Lang). Amber received the ammunition she needed, and she and Clarke escaped prosecution due to Sally's pleas for Stephanie not to press charges. It seems, however, that the Forresters have forgiven Clarke for this crime, as he is often present at their family gatherings.

Employment
Until recently Clarke worked at Forrester Creations, as the new head designer, after being hired by the new owners at that time, Nick (Jack Wagner) and Jackie Marone (Lesley-Anne Down). He was demoted to designer after Brooke returned to Forrester Creations and was made head designer. After Eric Forrester (John McCook) bought back Forrester Creations, he was under no obligation to honor Clarke's contract and Clarke was released from the company.

Not too long after Jackie Marone and Dominick Marone sold Forrester Creations back to the Forresters, Clarke found himself once again back at Spectra Fashions.  Because the new owners of Spectra Fashions had gone bankrupt, the company was reverted to Sally Spectra.  As she no longer wanted to run the business, Sally Spectra asked Clarke and their son C.J. to sell the business for her.  Knowing Jackie and her son would be interested, Clarke made his way to their home.  One thing led to the next and Nick purchased the company making Clarke their head designer.  The company was later renamed "M Fashions".

Clarke worked at Jackie M Designs, the company formerly known as Spectra Fashions.

External links
Character profile from soaps.com
Daniel McVicar official site
B&B official site

The Bold and the Beautiful characters
Television characters introduced in 1987
Fictional criminals in soap operas
Male characters in television
Fictional fashion designers